This timeline of the history of Tuvalu chronologically lists important events occurring within the present political boundaries of the Pacific island state of Tuvalu. This time line is introduced by the theories as to the origins of the Polynesian people and the migration across the Pacific Ocean to create Polynesia, which includes the islands of Tuvalu.

Theories as to the origins of the Polynesian people
The origins of the people of Tuvalu are addressed in the theories regarding the spread of humans out of Southeast Asia, from Taiwan, via Melanesia and across the Pacific islands to create Polynesia.There is evidence for a dual genetic origin of Pacific Islanders in Asia and Melanesia, which results from an analysis of Y chromosome (NRY) and mitochondrial DNA (mtDNA) markers);  This DNA evidence is supported by linguistic analysis. and archaeological evidence. There is also evidence that Fiji playing a pivotal role in west-to-east expansion within Polynesia.

Lapita archaeological culture
In the archaeological record there are well-defined traces of this expansion which allow the path it took to be followed and dated with some certainty. It is thought that by roughly 1400 BC,  "Lapita Peoples", so-named after their pottery tradition, appeared in the Bismarck Archipelago of northwest Melanesia. This culture is seen as having adapted and evolved through time and space since its emergence "Out of Taiwan".

Within a mere three or four centuries between about 1300 and 900 BC, the Lapita archaeological culture spread 6,000 km further to the east from the Bismarck Archipelago, until it reached as far as Fiji, Tonga, and Samoa. The area of Tonga, Fiji, and Samoa served as a gateway into the rest of the Pacific region known as Polynesia.

Settlement of Tuvalu and the Polynesian outliers

During pre-European-contact times there was frequent canoe voyaging between the islands as Polynesian navigation skills are recognised to have allowed deliberate journeys on double-hulled sailing canoes or outrigger canoes. Eight of the nine islands of Tuvalu were inhabited; thus the name, Tuvalu, means "eight standing together" in Tuvaluan.

The pattern of settlement that is believed to have occurred is that the Polynesians spread out from the Samoan Islands into the Tuvaluan atolls, with Tuvalu providing a stepping stone to migration into the Polynesian Outlier communities in Melanesia and Micronesia.

Tuvaluan mythology as to their ancestors is recounted in stories that vary from island to island. On Niutao the understanding is that their ancestors came from Samoa in the 12th or 13th century. On Funafuti and Vaitupu the founding ancestor is described as being from Samoa; whereas on Nanumea the founding ancestor is described as being from Tonga;  These stories can be linked to what is known about the Samoa-based Tu'i Manu'a Confederacy, ruled by the holders of the Tu'i Manu'a title, which confederacy likely included much of Western Polynesia and some outliers at the height of its power in the 10th and 11th centuries. Tuvalu is thought to have been visited by Tongans in the mid-13th century and was within Tonga's sphere of influence. The extent of influence of the Tuʻi Tonga line of Tongan kings and the existence of the Tuʻi Tonga Empire which originated in the 10th century, is disputed.

The oral history of Niutao recalls that in the 15th century Tongan warriors were defeated in a battle on the reef of Niutao. Tongan warriors also invaded Niutao later in the 15th century and again were repelled. A third and fourth invasion of Tongan occurred in the late 16th century, again with the Tongans being defeated.

Tuvalu is on the western boundary of the Polynesian Triangle so that the northern islands of Tuvalu, particularly Nui, have links to Micronesians from Kiribati. The oral history of Niutao also recalls that during the 17th century warriors invaded from the islands of Kiribati on two occasions and were defeated in battles fought on the reef.

pre-history

1568 to 1900

1901 to 1976

1977 to 2000

2001 to present

See also

 History of Oceania
 History of the Pacific Islands
 Exploration of the Pacific
 History of Tuvalu

External links
 Te Kakeega III – National Strategy for Sustainable Development 2016-2020
 Te Kete - National Strategy for Sustainable Development 2021-2030

References and literature
History
 Tuvalu: A History (1983) Isala, Tito and Larcy, Hugh (eds.), Institute of Pacific Studies, University of the South Pacific and Government of Tuvalu
 Pulekai A. Sogivalu, Brief History of Niutao, A, (1992) Published by the Institute of Pacific Studies. 
 Macdonald, Barrie, Cinderellas of the Empire: towards a history of Kiribati and Tuvalu, Institute of Pacific Studies, University of the South Pacific, Suva, Fiji, (2001).  (Australian National University Press, first published 1982)
References

Regional timelines